Rodney Heath defeated Horace Rice 6–4, 6–3, 6–2 in the final to win the men's singles tennis title at the 1910 Australasian Championships.

Draw

Key
 Q = Qualifier
 WC = Wild card
 LL = Lucky loser
 r = Retired

External links
 

1910 in tennis
Men's Singles